CVO Skool Pretoria is a private Afrikaans, Christian school. The school is located adjacent to Shere Smallholdings, approx. 10 km to the east of Lynnwood, Pretoria, South Africa.

It was founded in 1992 and the school leavers write the IEB Senior Certificate exam. It has about 300 pupils ranging from the grade 0 to grade 12.

Coat of arms

The Coat of Arms (see depiction on the right) is in the colours of the "Vierkleur van Transvaal" (Flag of the old Zuid-Afrikaansche Republiek):

The Green: A symbol of hope.
The Red: Symbol of willingness to defend our freedom with our own blood.
The White: Symbol of cleanliness and pure intentions towards freedom.
The Blue: Symbol of the heavens and the Boer people's trust in God triune as the Almighty.

The strong bond at the top of the coat of arms symbolises the strong bond to God.
The cross symbolises trust in Jesus Christ.
The wagon wheel symbolises the history of Boer-heraldry and culture.
(Note that the wagon wheel is underneath the cross, thus symbolising that the faith is the more important of the two and culture is derived from the faith).

The words "Gods Woord ons Anker" is the Afrikaans for "God's Word is our Anchor".

See also
 BCVO
CVO Skool Pretoria Kontakgroep
CVO Skool Pretoria official site
BCVO and BCVO Exam Board
OAER official site

Afrikaner culture in Pretoria
Christianity in Pretoria
Presbyterian schools in South Africa
Afrikaans-language schools
Private schools in Gauteng
Schools in Pretoria
Educational institutions established in 1992
1992 establishments in South Africa